Down Ryton Water is a children's historical novel by Eva Roe Gaggin. It tells the story of the Separatists of Scrooby and the Pilgrim Fathers through the first-person narrative of young Matt Over. The novel, illustrated by Elmer Hader, was first published in 1941 and was a Newbery Honor recipient in 1942.

References

1941 American novels
American children's novels
Children's historical novels
Newbery Honor-winning works
Novels set in Nottinghamshire
Novels set in the Netherlands
Novels set in Massachusetts
Novels set in the 17th century
Novels set in the American colonial era
Viking Press books
1941 children's books